Naji Majrashi (born 2 February 1982) is a football striker from Saudi Arabia.

He also played for the Saudi Arabia junior team at the 2003 FIFA World Youth Championship.

External links
 goalzz.com
 

1982 births
Living people
Saudi Arabian footballers
Association football forwards
Al-Shabab FC (Riyadh) players
Ulsan Hyundai FC players
K League 1 players
Expatriate footballers in South Korea
Saudi Arabian expatriate sportspeople in South Korea
Al-Raed FC players
Al-Riyadh SC players
Saudi First Division League players
Saudi Professional League players